TranspoGene in computational biology is a database of transposed elements  located inside protein-coding genes of seven species.

See also
 Transposon

References

External links
 http://transpogene.tau.ac.il/

Genetics databases
Mobile genetic elements